Against the Wind is a 2000  Italian drama film co-written and directed by Peter Del Monte. It entered the Panorama section at the 51st Berlin International Film Festival.

Plot 
An unstable actress (Nina) and her repressed child-psychiatrist sister (Clara) fall in love with the same man (Leo).

Cast 

Margherita Buy as Clara
Ennio Fantastichini as Leo
Valeria Golino as  Nina
Maria Monti as  Mother
Stefano Abbati as  Attilio

See also   
 List of Italian films of 2000

References

External links

2000 films
Italian drama films
Films directed by Peter Del Monte
2000 drama films
2000s Italian films